Blood Ransom is a 2014 independent American thriller vampire romance film directed by Francis dela Torre and starring Anne Curtis and Alexander Dreymon. The film was produced by Tectonic Films.

Plot

A young woman fights the monster she's becoming to save the life of the man she loves.

Crystal is a beautiful yet fragile girl in her early twenties. But something dark and brooding burns inside her and she fights to hold it back. She falls for the charms of the equally beautiful bad boy and criminal, Roman. He lures her into a life of “sin.” And she follows him. But when that life turns deadly, she regrets her choice. One day she wakes up and realizes that Roman has turned her into a monster. She is now trapped in a life she cannot escape. At least, no until she inadvertently finds a way out through a young nobody named Jeremiah, who works for Roman as a driver. She manages to “escape” from Roman through a foolish kidnapping plot that goes wrong. Jeremiah and Crystal subsequently begin a dangerous love affair and devise a crazy plan that can make her human again. But Roman sends his cold-blooded henchman, Bill, to hunt them down. Crystal is now faced with a deadly choice: she can kill Jeremiah to live, or follow an impossible plan that can turn her soul human again, so that she can be with the man with whom she has fallen in love.

Cast 
Anne Curtis as Crystal
Alexander Dreymon as Jeremiah
Caleb Hunt as Roman
Jamie Harris as Bill
Darion Basco as Daniel
Clifton Powell as Detective Hobbs
Vanessa Evigan as Anna
Emily Skinner as Emily Hudson
Suzette Ranillo as Tita Paz
Kevin Meaney as Mr. Manningham
Jon Jon Briones as Father Mena
Dion Basco as Oliver
Sam J. Warner as Arnie
Natalina Maggio as Ianne
Clayton Rohner as Rich White Guy
Melody Butiu as Angel
Carol Jones as Nora
Alli Cripe as Sasha
Faleolo Alailima as Bouncer
Adam Gifford as Max
Barclay DeVeau as Detective Kuber

Reception
The film received a mixed response from critics, but garnered praises from audiences, citing the film's dark and gritty take on the vampire mythology as one of the factors that made this film stand up from the rest of the genre.

References

External links 
 
 

2014 films
2014 thriller films
Viva Films films
2010s romantic thriller films
American romantic thriller films
2014 fantasy films
American vampire films
2010s English-language films
2010s American films
2014 horror films